The 2009 Bank Austria-TennisTrophy was a tennis tournament played on indoor hard courts. It was the 35th edition of the event known that year as the Bank Austria-TennisTrophy, and was part of the ATP World Tour 250 Series of the 2009 ATP World Tour. It was held at the Wiener Stadthalle in Vienna, Austria, from October 24 through November 1, 2009.

Entrants

Seeds

 Seeds are based on the rankings of October 19, 2009

Other entrants
The following players received wildcards into the singles main draw:
  Andreas Haider-Maurer
  Stefan Koubek

The following players received entry from the qualifying draw:
  Alejandro Falla
  Dominik Hrbatý
  Dieter Kindlmann
  Lukáš Rosol

The following players received lucky losers into the singles main draw:
  Michael Berrer

Finals

Singles

 Jürgen Melzer defeated  Marin Čilić 6–4, 6–3
It was Melzer's first title of the year and 2nd of his career.

Doubles

 Łukasz Kubot /  Oliver Marach defeated  Julian Knowle /  Jürgen Melzer 2–6, 6–4, [11–9]

References

External links
 Official website
 ATP tournament profile

2009 ATP World Tour
2009